Barrett Willoughby (May 18, 1901 – July 29, 1959),  Florance Barrett, was a best-selling novelist who wrote works of romantic fiction and nonfiction from the 1920s through the 1940s. Her writing was mainly mostly set in Alaska, where she spent many years. Some of her works were made into movies.

Bibliography
 Where the Sun Swings North (1922)
 The Devil Drum (1925)
 Rocking Moon (1925)
 Gentlemen Unafraid (1926)
 The Trail Eater (1929)
 Sitka, Portal to Romance (1930)
 Spawn of the North (1932)
 Alaskans All (1933)
 River House (1936)
 Alaska Holiday (1940)
 The Golden Totem, a novel of modern Alaska (1945)

Filmography
 Rocking Moon (*a movie was made in 1926 Rocking Moon)
 Spawn of the North

Sources

External links
 
 
 
 

1901 births
1959 deaths
20th-century American novelists
20th-century American women writers
American women novelists
Writers from Alaska